Turitea is a suburb of Palmerston North in the Manawatū-Whanganui region of New Zealand. It is located on the southern side of the Manawatu River, south of Massey University.

Turitea is the home to Palmerston North's water supply and location of a planned wind farm.

Most of Turitea is in the Fitzherbert Ward in the Palmerston North City Council, alongside the neighbouring suburbs of Aokautere and Linton.

Prior to 1996, Turitea was part of the Manawatu electorate. However, due to the reformation of the electoral system from FPP to MMP, the electorate of Palmerston North's boundaries were redrawn to include Turitea. In 2007, the boundaries were redrawn and Turitea was transferred to the Rangitikei electorate, thus making Palmerston North completely surrounded by Rangitikei.

Education

References

Suburbs of Palmerston North
Populated places in Manawatū-Whanganui